Miernicza Street, formerly Lützowstraße (Ludwig Adolf Wilhelm von Lützow), is a street in Wrocław, Poland. The Polish name is related to surveying. Many films were filmed there including Bridge of Spies by Steven Spielberg, A Woman in Berlin, Avalon, Aimée & Jaguar. Character.  The street was traced in 1886. The street is neglected, situated in the infamous 'Bermuda Triangle' district.

References

External links
Wratislaviae Amici

Streets in Wrocław
Film location shooting
Tourist attractions in Wrocław